Tuberaria is a genus of about 12 species of annual or perennial plants in the rockrose family Cistaceae, native to western and southern Europe. They occur on dry, stony sites, often close to the sea.

The leaves are in a rosette at the base of the plant, and then in opposite pairs up the stem; they are simple oval, 2–5 cm long and 1–2 cm broad. The flowers are 2–5 cm diameter, with five petals, yellow with a red spot at the base of each petal, the red spot acting as a 'target' for pollinating insects.

Tuberaria species are used as food plants by the larvae of some Lepidoptera species including the Coleophora case-bearers C. confluella (recorded on T. guttata) and C. helianthemella (recorded on T. lignosa).

Species
Species include:
Tuberaria acuminata (Viv.) Grosser
Tuberaria brevipes (Boiss. & Reut.) Willk.
Tuberaria bupleurifolia (Lam.) Willk.
Tuberaria echioides (Lam.) Willk.
Tuberaria globulariifolia (Lam.) Willk.
Tuberaria guttata (L.) Fourr.
Tuberaria lignosa (Sweet) Samp.
Tuberaria macrosepala Coss.) Willk.
Tuberaria major (Willk.) P.Silva & Rozeira
Tuberaria plantaginea (Willd.) M.J.Gallego
Tuberaria praecox (Salzm. ex Boiss. & Reut.) Grosser
Tuberaria villosissima (Pomel) Grosser

References

Flora Europaea: Tuberaria

Cistaceae
Malvales genera